Amphiodia is a genus of brittle stars belonging to the family Amphiuridae.

Species

References
Amphiodia at the World Ophiuroidea Database

 
Amphiuridae
Ophiuroidea genera
Taxa named by Addison Emery Verrill